"Lee Majors Come Again" is a song by alternative hip hop group Beastie Boys, released as the first single from their eighth studio album Hot Sauce Committee Part Two (2011).

Promo singles of the track were given out in very select copies of the Check Your Head quadruple reissue boxset. The track made its first appearance in media on the game DJ Hero, where it was mixed with Daft Punk's "Da Funk", listed as the final mix in the game when sorted by intensity. The track also appears in the EA game Skate 3.

The title of the song refers to American actor Lee Majors.

Track listing
7" single

References

2009 singles
Beastie Boys songs
Capitol Records singles
2009 songs
Songs written by Ad-Rock
Songs written by Mike D
Songs written by Adam Yauch